David Sinclair may refer to:
 David Sinclair (footballer, born 1969), Scottish football player (Raith Rovers)
 David Sinclair (footballer, born 1990), Scottish football player
 David Sinclair (Numbers), a fictitious FBI agent in the TV series Numb3rs
 David A. Sinclair (born 1969), Australian biologist
 David A. Sinclair (1874–1902), Scottish immigrant and secretary of the Dayton YMCA, namesake of Sinclair Community College
 Dave Sinclair (born 1947), keyboardist
 David Sinclair (actor) (1934–1996), British actor
 David Sinclair (runner), American runner
 David Sinclair (physicist) (1901–1987), research physicist and a son of Upton Sinclair

See also
 Sinclair (surname)